The 2020–21 Washington Huskies women's basketball team represented University of Washington during the 2020–21 NCAA Division I women's basketball season. The Huskies, led by fourth-year head coach Jody Wynn, played their home games at Alaska Airlines Arena at Hec Edmundson Pavilion in Seattle, Washington as members of the Pac-12 Conference. On March 15, 2021, following a season with a 7–13 (3–13 Pac-12) record, Wynn was fired as head coach.

Roster

Schedule

|-
!colspan=9 style=| Regular season

|-
!colspan=9 style=| Pac-12 Women's Tournament

46

See also
2020–21 Washington Huskies men's basketball team

References

Washington Huskies women's basketball seasons
Washington Huskies women
Washington Huskies basketball, women
Washington Huskies basketball, women